TDO may refer to:

 TDO connector, the telephone plug used in Austria.
 The Delicious One, the mascot of the Wienerschnitzel restaurant
 Tryptophan 2,3-dioxygenase, an enzyme in the metabolism of tryptophan
 Tricho–dento–osseous syndrome, a rare genetic disorder affecting hair, teeth, and bones.
 Teen Dance Ordinance, a law in Seattle enacted after morality crusades against all-ages nightclubs.